The Verband der Vereine Deutscher Studenten (VVDSt), also known as the Kyffhäuserverband is an umbrella organization of 38 German fraternities called Verein Deutscher Studenten (VDSt)).

History 

The first Verein deutscher Studenten was founded in 1881 in Berlin, Halle, Leipzig, Breslau, Greifswald und Kiel.

Notable members 

 Otto Dibelius (1880–1967)
 Johannes Dieckmann (1893–1969)
 Hermann Ehlers (1904–1954)
 Wolfgang Finkelnburg (1905–1967)
 Ferdinand Friedensburg (1886–1972)
 Hans Fritzsche (1900–1953)
 Heinrich George (1893–1946)
 Hellmut von Gerlach (1866–1935)
 Helmut Hasse (1898–1979)
 Wolfgang Heine (1861–1944)
 Richard Heinze (1867–1929)
 Rudolf Heinze (1865–1928)
 Sepp Helfrich (1900–1963)
 Otto Hoetzsch (1876–1946)
 Joachim Hossenfelder (1899–1976)
 Wolfgang Huber (1942–)
 Peter Jensen (1861–1936)
 Georg Kelling (1866–1945)
 Gerhard Kittel (1888–1948)
 Wilhelm Kube (1887–1943)
 Rudolf Lehmann (1890–1955)
 Hanfried Lenz (1916–2013)
 Hubertus, Prince of Löwenstein-Wertheim-Freudenberg (1906–1984)
 Max Maurenbrecher (1874–1929)
 Ernst Meumann (1862–1915)
 Joachim Mrugowsky (1905–1948)
 Ludwig Müller (1883–1945)
 Rudolf Nadolny (1873–1953)
 Friedrich Naumann (1860–1919)
 Karl Ernst Osthaus (1874–1921)
 Otto Peltzer (1900–1970)
 Kurt Scharf (1902–1990)
 Gustav Adolf Scheel (1907–1979)
 Otto Tumlirz (1890–1957)
 Otmar Freiherr von Verschuer (1896–1969)
 Ernst Wahle (1889–1981)
 Augusto Weberbauer (1871–1948)
 Kuno von Westarp (1864–1945)

External links
 Webpage of the VVDSt
 Historical card collection of the VVDSt
 Journal of the VVDSt Akademische Blätter

Student societies in Germany
1881 establishments in Germany